Mata Kanny Vaile (1953-2019) was an international lawn bowler from the Cook Islands.

Bows career
Vaile won the bronze medal in the triples at Asia Pacific Bowls Championships in Christchurch.

She was selected to represent the Cook Islands at six Commonwealth Games. The fours in 1994 and 1998, the pairs in 2002 and 2006, the triples in 2010 and the triples and fours in 2014.

She died in 2019 and was buried at the family burial site in Tauae. She assisted her father in building the greens at the Rarotonga Bowling Club and won six gold medals and six bronze medals in National Championships.

References

1953 births
2019 deaths
Cook Island female bowls players
Bowls players at the 1994 Commonwealth Games
Bowls players at the 1998 Commonwealth Games
Bowls players at the 2002 Commonwealth Games
Bowls players at the 2006 Commonwealth Games
Bowls players at the 2010 Commonwealth Games
Bowls players at the 2014 Commonwealth Games
Commonwealth Games competitors for the Cook Islands
People from Rarotonga